Šotovento is a municipality in Primorje-Gorski Kotar County on the island of Krk in western Croatia. Part of the town of Krk, it is adjacent to Malinska-Dubašnica.

Geography 

According to the 2011 census, there were 1,206 inhabitants in 10 settlements:

Other settlements and sites include Brozici, Kapovci and Glavotok, and the ferry port of Valbiska. Glavotok, the island's westernmost point, belonged to the Frankopan family during the 14th century. At the beginning of the 16th century, the Franciscan Third Order Regular of Saint Francis of Penance built a monastery and several houses. Near Glavotok is an oak forest.

Valbiska has been a dock for ferries on the Valbiska-Merag line, from Krk to the island of Cres, since 2009; this followed ferry lines from Baška to Lopar and Valbiska to Lopar, on the island of Rab. It has a catering facility and a gas station.

The boundary between Šotovento and the rest of Krk begins at the bay of Cavlenet in the northwest and passes the Klobučac and Vrhura mountains, the border with Dubašnica in the north. From Vrh Vrh the boundary runs south to Valbiska, separating Sotovento (in the east) from Vrh and the Picik region. In the west and south are the Middle Gate, the sea channel between Krk and Cres.

Name 
Šotovento derives from the Italian sotto (below) and vento (the wind). Located below several small mountains – Vrhzur, ; Kukurik,  and Skrlat,  – it is protected from the bora. This protection, and its southwest orientation, favored vegetation.

History 
Šotovento has always been part of the town of Krk. When the Croats arrived on the island of Krk during the 7th century, they settled on its eastern part. Many place names in the west, therefore, remain Romance rather than Slavic in origin.

When Ivan VII Frankapan (who owned the island of Krk) decided to expand his holdings during the 15th century to increase tax revenue, Vlachs had settled in Dubasnica, Šotovento and northern Dobrinj. They spoke the Krčurumunj language, whose last speaker (Mate Bajcic) died in 1875. The island was divided into seven municipalities in 1992, and Šotovento remained within the town of Krk.

Attractions 

Šotovento has a number of churches and other religious buildings:
 Franciscan monastery in Glavotok
 Parish church in Poljice 
 Church of St. Francis in Skrbčić - Built during the late 16th or early 17th century, it has been renovated and expanded twice.
 Chapel of St. Peter in Brzac – Built in 1693 by Juraj Nenadić Matov and his wife, Kate Zako.
 Chapel of St. Leonarda in Bajcici - Built in 1769
 Chapel of St. Cecilia in Brusici - 1565

Ruins remain of a number of other chapels. Near the monastery at Glavotok is a protected one-hectare oak forest.

References

Sources
 Bolonić, Mihovil and Žic-Rokov, Ivan. "The Island of Krk through the Centuries". The Christian Present, Zagreb (2002)
 The Island of Krk is a Western Part. Historical Society of the Island of Krk (1986)
 Lešić, Denis: The Island of Krk: A Guide in Words and Pictures (2003)

 
Populated places in Primorje-Gorski Kotar County